Cedrick Mughisha Banzi (born 14 May 1997 in Kigali, Rwanda) is a football player and television and film actor, known for his performances in the Spanish television serie Smiley in 2022 with Catalan actor Carlos Cuevas.

He played in 1. SC Znojmo FK in Czech Republic, then in the Rayo Vallecano football club in Madrid from 2021.

In 2019, he appeared Pedro Almodóvar's movie Pain and Glory.

He played also on the Spanish TV series Cuéntame cómo pasó and sitcom La que se avecina.

References

1997 births
Living people
Spanish footballers
Rayo Vallecano players
Rwandan male actors
Rwandan television actors
Spanish television actors
People from Kigali
21st-century Spanish male actors
Rwanda international footballers